The Max Planck Institute for Developmental Biology Tübingen was located in Tübingen, Germany; it was founded as Max Planck Institute for Virus Research in 1954 as an offshoot of the Tübingen-based Max Planck Institute for Biology. From 1984 to 2021, it was named Max Planck Institute for Developmental Biology. The topics of scientific research conducted at the institute cover a very wide range -- from biochemistry, cell and developmental biology to evolutionary and ecological genetics, functional genomics and bioinformatics -- in order to address fundamental questions in microbial, plant and animal biology, including the interaction between different organisms.

Departments 
 Protein Evolution - Andrei Lupas
 Microbiome Science - Ruth E. Ley
 Evolutionary Biology - Ralf J. Sommer
 Molecular Biology - Detlef Weigel (Gottfried Wilhelm Leibniz Prize, Member of the US National Academy of Sciences, Foreign Member of the Royal Society)
 Algal Development and Evolution - Susana Coelho
 Genetics - C. Nüsslein-Volhard (emeritus; Nobel Prize in Physiology or Medicine in 1995, Gottfried Wilhelm Leibniz Prize, Member of the US National Academy of Sciences, Foreign Member of the Royal Society)
 Cell Biology - Gerd Jürgens (emeritus; Gottfried Wilhelm Leibniz Prize)

See also 
 Max Planck Society

References

External links 
 Max Planck Institute for Biology Tübingen

Biology
Biological research institutes
Education in Tübingen
Genetics in Germany
Organisations based in Tübingen